The Municipality of Črenšovci is a municipality in the Prekmurje region in northeastern Slovenia. The seat of the municipality is the town of Črenšovci.

Settlements
In addition to the municipal seat of Črenšovci, the municipality also includes the following settlements:
 Dolnja Bistrica
 Gornja Bistrica
 Srednja Bistrica
 Trnje
 Žižki

References

External links

Municipality of Črenšovci on Geopedia

Crensovci
1994 establishments in Slovenia